Henry S. Metz is an American pediatric ophthalmologist. He was the CEO of the Smith-Kettlewell Institute in San Francisco from 2003 to 2008.  Much of his early research concerned eye movements and strabismus, including saccadic velocity measurements and use of botulinum toxin.

Education and career 
After completed his undergraduate degree from Columbia College, Columbia University, Metz received his medical degree from SUNY and MBA from the University of Rochester.  He did a medical internship at the Jewish Hospital of Brooklyn, followed by an ophthalmology residency at the University of Rochester School of Medicine and strabismus fellowship at the Smith-Kettlewell Eye Research Institute.  His fellowship preceptor was the renowned strabismologist Arthur Jampolsky.  During the late 1990s Metz maintained private practice in Rochester and at The Eye Specialists Center in Illinois, and served as Visiting Professor at The University of Illinois Eye and Ear Infirmary until his appointment at Smith-Kettlewell in 2003.

Honors and offices held 
 1978–1993, Chair of the Department of Ophthalmology at the University of Rochester Eye Institute
 Editor-in-chief of the Journal of Pediatric Ophthalmology and Strabismus (JPOS), 1982–1988
 1990–1991, President of the American Association for Pediatric Ophthalmology and Strabismus 
 1993, Frank D. Costenbader lecturer, AAPOS
 Medical advisory board, Better Vision for Children Foundation

Published works (partial list)

See also 
American Association for Pediatric Ophthalmology and Strabismus

External links
 https://web.archive.org/web/20070425085702/http://www.ski.org/index.html – The Smith-Kettlewell Eye Research Institute official website
 Smith-Kettlewell Institute – Wikipedia page for The Smith-Kettlewell Eye Research Institute

Living people
American ophthalmologists
American pediatricians
Year of birth missing (living people)
Pediatric ophthalmologists
Place of birth missing (living people)
Columbia College (New York) alumni
University of Rochester alumni
Smith-Kettlewell Eye Research Institute people